A checked tone, commonly known by the Chinese calque entering tone, is one of the four syllable types in the phonology of Middle Chinese. Although usually translated as "tone", a checked tone is not a tone in the phonetic sense but rather a syllable that ends in a stop consonant or a glottal stop. Separating the checked tone allows -p, -t, and -k to be treated as allophones of -m, -n, and -ng, respectively, since they are in complementary distribution. Stops appear only in the checked tone, and nasals appear only in the other tones. Because of the origin of tone in Chinese, the number of tones found in such syllables is smaller than the number of tones in other syllables. In Chinese phonetics, they have traditionally been counted separately.

For instance, in Cantonese, there are six tones in syllables that do not end in stops but only three in syllables that do so. That is why although Cantonese has only six tones, in the sense of six contrasting variations in pitch, it is often said to have nine tones.

Final voiceless stops and therefore the checked "tones" have disappeared from most Mandarin dialects, spoken in northern and southwestern China, but have been preserved in the southeastern branches of Chinese, such as Yue, Min, and Hakka.

Tones are an indispensable part of Chinese literature, as characters in poetry and prose were chosen according to tones and rhymes for their euphony. This use of language helps the reconstruction of the pronunciation of Old Chinese and Middle Chinese since the Chinese writing system is logographic, rather than phonetic.

Phonetics
In some variants of Chinese, the final stop has become a glottal stop, .

History

The voiceless stops that typify the entering tone date back to the Proto-Sino-Tibetan, the parent language of Chinese as well as the Tibeto-Burman languages. Clusters later were reduced to /s/, which, in turn, became  and ultimately tone 3 in Middle Chinese (the "departing tone").

The first Chinese philologists began to describe the phonology of Chinese during the Early Middle Chinese period (specifically, during the Northern and Southern Dynasties, between 400 and 600 AD), under the influence of Buddhism and the Sanskrit language that arrived along with it. There were several unsuccessful attempts to classify the tones of Chinese before the establishment of the traditional four-tone description between 483 and 493. It is based on the Vedic theory of three intonations (聲明論). The middle intonation, maps to the "level tone" (平聲); the upwards intonation, to the "rising tone" (上聲); the downward intonation, to the "departing tone" (去聲). The distinctive sound of syllables ending with a stop did not fit the three intonations and was categorised as the "entering tone" (入聲). The use of four-tone system flourished in the Sui and Tang dynasties (7th–10th centuries). An important rime dictionary, Qieyun, was written in this period.

Note that modern linguistic descriptions of Middle Chinese often refer to the level, rising and departing tones as tones 1, 2 and 3, respectively.

By the time of the Mongol invasion (the Yuan dynasty, 1279–1368), former final stops had been reduced to a glottal stop  in Mandarin. The Zhongyuan Yinyun, a rime book of 1324, already shows signs of the disappearance of the glottal stop and the emergence of the modern Mandarin tone system in its place. The precise time at which the loss occurred is unknown though it was likely gone by the time of the Qing Dynasty, in the 17th century.

Example

Entering tone in Chinese

Mandarin

The entering tone is extant in Jianghuai Mandarin and the Minjiang dialect of Sichuanese. In other dialects, the entering tone has been lost, and words that had the tone have been distributed into the four modern tonal categories, depending on the initial consonant of each word.

In the Beijing dialect that underlies Standard Mandarin, syllables beginning with originally unvoiced consonants are redistributed across the four tones in a completely random pattern. For example, the three characters , all pronounced  in Middle Chinese (William Baxter's reconstruction), are now pronounced , with tones 1, 3 and 4 respectively.

Similarly, the three characters  (Middle Chinese ) are now pronounced , with tones 1, 2 and 4. The four characters  (Middle Chinese ) are now pronounced , with tones 1, 2, 2 and 3.

In those cases, the two sets of characters are significant in that each member of the same set has the same phonetic component, suggesting that the phonetic component of a character has little to do with the tone class that the character is assigned to.

In other situations, however, the opposite appears to be the case. For example, the group / of six homophones, all  in Middle Chinese and divided into a group of four with one phonetic and a group of two with a different phonetic, splits so that the first group of four is all pronounced  (tone 2) and the second group of two is pronounced  (tone 4). In such situations like this, it may be that only one of the characters in each group normally occurs in speech with an identifiable tone, and as a result, a "reading pronunciation" of the other characters was constructed based on the phonetic element of the character.

The chart below summarizes the distribution in the different dialects.

Wu 
In Wu Chinese, the entering tone has been preserved. However, the sounds with an entering tone no longer ends in /p/, /t/ or /k/, but rather a glottal stop /ʔ/ in most Wu dialects. In some dialects such as Wenzhounese, even the glottal stop has disappeared.

The sounds of entering tones can be divided into two registers, depending on the initials:

"dark entering" (陰入), a high-pitched checked tone, with a voiceless initial.
 "light entering" (陽入), a low-pitched checked tone, with a voiced initial.

Cantonese
Like most other variants of Chinese, Cantonese has changed initial voiced stops, affricates and fricatives of Middle Chinese to their voiceless counterparts. To compensate for the loss of that difference, Cantonese has split each of the Middle Chinese tones into two, one for Middle Chinese voiced initial consonants (yang) and one for Middle Chinese voiceless initial consonants (yin). In addition, Cantonese has split the yin-entering tone into two, with a higher tone for short vowels and a lower tone for long vowels. As a result, Cantonese now has three entering tones:

Upper yin (short yin, 短陰入/上陰入)
Middle / Lower yin (long yin, 長中入/下中入), derived from the upper tone
Upper yang (short yang, 中入/短陽入/上陽入)
Lower yang (long yang, 長陽入/下陽入)
Some variants of Cantonese have four entering tones such that the lower yang tone is differentiated according to the length of the vowel, short vowels for Upper yin and long vowels for Lower yin. 
According to 杨蔚. 粤语古入声分化情况的当代考察. 2002. PhD Thesis.

中國
The entering tone in Cantonese has retained its short and sharp character.

Hakka
Hakka preserves all of the entering tones of Middle Chinese and is split into two registers. The Meixian Hakka dialect often taken as the paradigm gives the following:

 "dark entering" (陰入) , a low-pitched checked tone
 "light entering" (陽入) , a high-pitched checked tone

Middle Chinese entering tone syllables ending in  whose vowel clusters have become front high vowels like  and  shifts to syllables with  finals in some of the modern Hakka, as seen in the following table.

Min
Southern Min (Minnan, including Taiwanese) has two entering tones:

Upper (yin, 陰入), also numbered tone 4
Lower (yang, 陽入), tone 8

A word may switch from one tone to the other by tone sandhi. Words with entering tones end with a glottal stop ([-h]), [-p], [-t] or [-k] (all unaspirated). There are many words that have different finals in their literary and colloquial forms.

Entering tone in Sino-Xenic
Many Chinese words were borrowed into Japanese, Korean and Vietnamese during the Middle Chinese period so they preserve the entering tone to varying degrees.

Japanese
Because Japanese does not allow a syllable to end with a consonant except ん n, the endings -k, -p, -t were rendered as separate syllables -ku or -ki, -pu, and -ti (-chi) or -tu (-tsu) respectively. Later phonological changes further altered some of the endings:

 In some cases in which the ending is immediately followed by an unvoiced consonant in a compound, the ending is lost, and the consonant becomes geminate.
 Examples: 学 gaku + 校 kau (> Modern Japanese kō) becomes 学校 gakkō (school), and 失 shitsu + 敗 pai (> Modern Japanese hai when standing alone) becomes 失敗 shippai (failure)
 The -pu ending changes into -u. (pu>fu>hu>u). That process can be followed by -au -> -ō and -iu -> -yū.
 Example: 十 jipu (ten) becomes jū

It is possible to recover the original ending by examining the historical kana used in spelling a word.

Korean

Vietnamese
Additionally, after the vowels ê or i, the ending -c changes to -ch, giving rise to -ich and -êch, and ach (pronounced like aik) also occurs for some words ending with -k.

Only the sắc and nặng tones are allowed on check tones. In Sino-Vietnamese vocabulary, those tones were split from the Middle Chinese "entering" tone in a similar fashion to Cantonese. Whether the tone of a syllable should be sắc or nặng depends on the voicing of the initial consonant of the original Middle Chinese syllable.

Reconstruction of entering tones from Mandarin
Although it is hard to distinguish words of entering tone origin based on only Mandarin pronunciation, it is possible to do so, to an extent, with the help of the phonetic component of each Chinese character. Although it is not completely accurate, it is a quick way to identify characters of the entering tone.
 If a character has a phonetic component and is known to have an entering tone, other characters that have that phonetic component probably have an entering tone. For example, if one already knows that 白 (white) is of the entering tone, one can conjecture that 拍 (beat), 柏 (fir), 帛 (white cloth), 迫 (urgent) are also of entering tone.
 Characters that begin with an unaspirated obstruent (Pinyin b, d, g, j, z, or zh), end in a vowel, and have a light level tone (阳平) in Mandarin (corresponding to a rising tone in Standard Mandarin) almost always derive from an entering tone. For example  dé,  gé,  jué,  zá and  zhái all come from entering tones.
 On the other hand, characters that begin with an unaspirated obstruent and end in a nasal final (n or ng) in Mandarin almost never have a light level tone. E.g. *gáng and *zún are not recognised syllables in Modern Standard Mandarin.

See also
Historical Chinese phonology
Sino-Japanese vocabulary
Sino-Korean vocabulary
Sino-Vietnamese vocabulary
Tone name

References

External links

Chinese language